Nigel Coates is the name of:

Nigel Coates (admiral) (1959–2010), Australian admiral
Nigel Coates (architect) (born 1949), British architect